Among the Haudenosaunee (the "Six Nations," comprising the Mohawk, Onondaga, Oneida, Cayuga, Seneca, and Tuscarora peoples) the Great Law of Peace (Mohawk: Kaianere’kó:wa), also known as Gayanashagowa, is the oral constitution of the Iroquois Confederacy. The law was written on wampum belts, conceived by Dekanawidah, known as the Great Peacemaker, and his spokesman Hiawatha. The original five member nations ratified this constitution near modern-day Victor, New York, with the sixth nation (the Tuscarora) being added in 1722.

The laws were first recorded and transmitted not in written language, but by means of wampum symbols that conveyed meaning. In a later era it was translated into English and various other accounts exist. The Great Law of Peace is presented as part of a narrative noting laws and ceremonies to be performed at prescribed times. The laws, called a constitution, are divided into 117 articles. The united Iroquois nations are symbolized by an eastern white pine tree, called the Tree of Peace. Each nation or tribe plays a delineated role in the conduct of government.

The Iroquois claim the events date back to the late 12th century (around 1190).

Narrative, constitution, and ceremony
The narratives of the Great Law exist in the languages of the member nations, so spelling and usages vary. William N. Fenton observed that it came to serve a purpose as a social organization inside and among the nations, a constitution of the Iroquois Confederacy or League, ceremonies to be observed, and a binding history of peoples. Fenton also observed some nine common points focusing more simply on the narrative story line, though Christopher Vecsey identified 22 points shared across some two dozen versions of the narrative or parts of the narrative both direct and indirect:
Narrative
 The Migration and Separation of the People (pre-history of the area)
 The Birth and Growth of Deganawida
 The Journey to the Mohawks, the Situation, and the Mission Explained
 The Mother of Nations Accepts Deganawida's Message
 The Cannibal Converts
 The Prophets Prove Their Power
 Tadadaho the Wizard Prevents Peace
 Hiawatha's Relatives Are Killed
 Hiawatha Mourns and Quits Onondaga
 Hiawatha Invents Wampum
 Hiawatha Gives the Mohawks Lessons in Protocol
 Deganawida Consoles Hiawatha
 Scouts Travel to Tadadaho
 Deganawida and Hiawatha Join Oneidas, Cayugas, and Senecas to Mohawks
 The Nations March to Tadadaho, Singing the Peace Hymn
 Deganawida and Hiawatha Transform Tadadaho
Constitution of the Confederacy and social order of the member peoples
 Deganawida and Hiawatha Establish Iroquois Unity and Law
 Deganawida and Hiawatha Establish League Chiefs and Council Polity
 The Confederacy Takes Symbolic Images
 The League Declares Its Sovereignty (the Constitutional laws of the Confederacy)
Ceremony
 The Condolence Maintains the Confederacy (a sequence of ceremonies for grieving over a deceased chief and appointing a new one)
 Deganawida Departs

Barbara Mann has gathered versions featuring conflicting but harmonized elements (who does what varies, but what happens is more consistent than not), or stories that tell distinct elements not shared in other versions, into a narrative she includes in the Encyclopedia of the Haudenosaunee published in 2000.

Published accounts

Cayuga
An untranslated version has been posted by the Smithsonian Institution. Another is mentioned being presented to Michael Foster.

Mohawk 
There are several Mohawk versions that made it into print and several of those were printed more than once. Horatio Hale published one in 1883 he traced somewhat earlier which was reprinted by William N. Fenton, following Arthur Caswell Parker, in 1968. J. N. B. Hewitt published one in 1928 based on a much earlier fragment. Joseph Brant and John Norton commented on details of the narrative as early as 1801 and published since. Dayodekane, better known as Seth Newhouse, arranged for some versions that were published differently near 1900 - first from 1885 included in a book by Paul A. W. Wallace in 1948, and a second version published in 1910 by Arthur C. Parker. Fenton discusses Newhouse' contributions in a paper in 1949. Wallace also published a separate book without stating his source in 1946 called The Iroquois book of Life - White Roots of Peace, which was later revised and extended with endorsements by Iroqouis chiefs and Iroquoian historian John Mohawk in 1986 and 1994.

Oneida
Oneida versions have been noted in various places. One from New York, has been echoed/summarized by the Milwaukee Public Museum. Another has been published by the Oneida Nation of Wisconsin in two sections. Another account is also reported. Paula Underwood, an oral historian who traces her history to an Oneida ancestor, was also related to Benjamin Franklin. Her familial oral history describing Shenandoah's close relationship and collaboration with Benjamin Franklin on the writing of the US Constitution was published in 1997.

Onondaga
Parts of Horatio Hale's work The Iroquois Book of Rites is said to have Onondaga sources. J. N. B. Hewitt recorded Chief John Buck and included his presentation in 1892. John Arthur Gibson shared several versions that have gathered notable awareness among scholars like Fenton and others. His first version was in 1899. Gibson then participated in a collective version with many Chiefs from the Six Nations of the Grand River Reserve in 1900 which was reprinted a number of times: first in 1910/1, and then included in another work. A final version was offered to Alexander Goldenweiser but wasn't finished translated and published until 1992 by Hanni Woodbury.

Seneca
Newspaper editor William Walker Canfield published a book The Legends of the Iroquois in 1902 based on found notes he was given purporting to be written from comments of Cornplanter reportedly to an employee of the surveyor company Holland Land Company, perhaps John Adlum, known friend of Cornplanter. It is the primary source of the mention of a solar eclipse. Another Seneca version was given by Deloe B. Kittle to Parker and was published in 1923.

Tuscarora
The Tuscarora joined the Iroquois Confederacy in 1722. There is a version of the Great Law of Peace attributed by Wallace "Mad Bear" Anderson of the Tuscarora published in 1987. However, there is a claim this was borrowed.

Influence on the United States Constitution 

Some historians, including Donald Grinde, have claimed that the democratic ideals of the Kaianere’kó:wa provided a significant inspiration to Benjamin Franklin, James Madison and other framers of the U.S. Constitution. They contend that the federal structure of the U.S. constitution was influenced by the living example of the Iroquois confederation, as were notions of individual liberty and the separation of powers. Grinde, Bruce Johansen and others also identify Native American symbols and imagery that were adopted by the nascent United States, including the American bald eagle and a bundle of arrows. Their thesis argues the U.S. constitution was the synthesis of various forms of political organization familiar to the founders, including the Iroquois confederation.

Franklin circulated copies of the proceedings of the 1744 Treaty of Lancaster among his fellow colonists; at the close of this document, the Six Nations leaders offer to impart instruction in their democratic methods of government to the English. Franklin's Albany Plan is also believed to have been influenced by his understanding of Iroquois government. John Rutledge of South Carolina, delegate to the Constitutional Convention, is said to have read lengthy tracts of Six Nations law to the other framers, beginning with the words "We, the people, to form a union, to establish peace, equity, and order..." In October 1988, the U.S. Congress passed Concurrent Resolution 331 to recognize the influence of the Iroquois Constitution upon the American Constitution and Bill of Rights.

The extent of the influence of Six Nations law on the U.S. Constitution is disputed by other scholars. Haudenosaunee historian Elisabeth J. Tooker has pointed to several differences between the two forms of government, notably that all decisions were made by a consensus of male chiefs who gained their position through a combination of blood descent and selection by female relatives, that representation was on the basis of the number of clans in the group rather than the size or population of the clans, that the topics discussed were decided by a single tribe. Tooker concluded there is little resemblance between the two documents, or reason to believe the Six Nations had a meaningful influence on the American Constitution, and that it is unclear how much impact Canasatego's statement at Lancaster actually had on the representatives of the colonies. Stanford University historian Jack N. Rakove argued against any Six Nations influence, pointing to lack of evidence in U.S. constitutional debate records, and examples of European antecedents for democratic institutions.

Journalist Charles C. Mann has noted other differences between The Great Law of Peace and the original U.S. Constitution, including the original Constitution's allowing denial of suffrage to women, and majority rule rather than consensus. Mann argues that the early colonists' interaction with Native Americans and their understanding of Iroquois government did influence the development of colonial society and culture and the Suffragette movement, but stated that "the Constitution as originally enacted was not at all like the Great Law."

In 'Hierarchy in the Forest: The Evolution of Egalitarian Behavior' political anthropologist Christopher Boehm considers the U.S. Constitution to be a counter dominance strategy that allows citizens to dominate their leader rather than the other way around. He also concludes that the Founding Fathers borrowed wisely from the Iroquois government in forming the Constitution.

Example articles
 §37: There shall be one war chief from each nation, and their duties shall be to carry messages for their chiefs, and to take up arms in case of emergency. They shall not participate in the proceedings of the Council of the League, but shall watch its progress and in case of an erroneous action by a chief, they shall receive the complaints of the people and convey the warnings of the women to him. The people who wish to convey messages to the chiefs of the League shall do so through the war chief of their nation. It shall always be his duty to lay the cases, questions, and propositions of the people before the council of the League.

 §58: Any Chief or other person who submit to Laws of a foreign people are alienated and forfeit all claim in the Five Nations.

 §101: It shall be the duty of the appointed managers of the Thanksgiving festivals to do all that is needful for carrying out the duties of the occasions. The recognized festivals of Thanksgiving shall be the Midwinter Thanksgiving, the Maple or Sugar-Making Thanksgiving, the Raspberry Thanksgiving, the Strawberry Thanksgiving, the Corn Planting Thanksgiving, the Corn Hoeing Thanksgiving, The Little Festival of Green Corn, the Great Festival of Ripe Corn, and the Complete Thanksgiving for the Harvest. Each nation's festivals shall be held in their Longhouses.

 §107: A certain sign shall be known to all the people of the Five Nations which shall denote that the owner or occupant of a house is absent. A stick or pole in a slanting or leaning position shall indicate this and be the sign. Every person not entitled to enter the house by right of living within upon seeing such a sign shall not enter the house by day or by night, but shall keep as far away as his business will permit.

Notes

References 
 Mann, Charles C. 1491: New Revelations of the Americas Before Columbus. New York: Alfred A. Knopf, 2005.

Further reading 

What is the Great Law of Peace?

External links 

 U.S. Congress, H.Con.Res.331 "A concurrent resolution to acknowledge the contribution of the Iroquois Confederacy of Nations to the development of the United States Constitution and to reaffirm the continuing government-to-government relationship between Indian tribes and the United States established in the Constitution."
 Text of U.S. Congressional Statute "Iroquois Confederacy and Indian Nations--Recognizing Contributions to the United States" PDF

 The Iroquois Confederacy: Our Forgotten National Heritage  (Interview w/ Dr. Donald Grinde Jr.)

 The Law
Ganienkeh Territory Council Fire, Onkwehonwe people
 Exemplar of Liberty: Native America and the Evolution of Democracy by Donald Grinde & Bruce Johansen - see esp. Chapter 2 for a detailed description of Kaianerekowa or Great Law of Peace at the end of all this all the creators had a celebration to show it really was peace

Iroquois
Native American law
Constitutions of former countries